Josephine Butler Parks Center is an historic house, located at 2437 15th Street, Northwest, Washington, D.C., in the Meridian Hill neighborhood.  It was listed on the U.S. National Register of Historic Places as House at 2437 Fifteenth Street, NW.

History
The 1927 Renaissance revival house was designed by George Oakley Totten, Jr., for Mary Foote Henderson, widow of Senator John B. Henderson.

In 1941, the house was sold to the American Legion.  
In 1951, it became the embassy of the People's Republic of Hungary. 
In 1977, it bought by B.C.G. Associates, and rented,
In 1982, it was bought by the New China News Agency.
In 1987, it was bought by Coolidge House  Associates.

The Parks Center is an office for the non-profit Washington Parks and People and was named in honor of environmentalist, labor organizer and activist, Josephine Butler.

See also
Embassy of Ecuador in Washington, D.C., next door at 2535 Fifteenth St.

References

Columbia Heights, Washington, D.C.
Houses completed in 1927
Houses on the National Register of Historic Places in Washington, D.C.
Renaissance Revival architecture in Washington, D.C.